The 2016–17 Oklahoma State Cowgirls basketball team will represent Oklahoma State University in the 2016–17 NCAA Division I women's basketball season. The Cowgirls, led by sixth year head coach Jim Littell, played their home games at Gallagher-Iba Arena and were members of the Big 12 Conference. They finished the season 17–15, 6–12 in Big 12 play to finish in a tie for seventh place. They advanced to the quarterfinals of the Big 12 women's tournament where they lost to Texas. They received an at-large bid to the Women's National Invitation Tournament where they lost to Abilene Christian in the first round.

Roster

Schedule and results

|-
! colspan=9 style="background:#000000; color:#FF6600;"|Exhibition

|-
!colspan=9 style="background:#000000; color:#FF6600;"| Non-conference regular season

|-
!colspan=9 style="background:#000000; color:#FF6600;"| Conference regular season

|-
!colspan=12 style="background:#000000; color:#FF6600;"| Big 12 Women's Tournament

|-
!colspan=12 style="background:#000000; color:#FF6600;"| WNIT

Rankings
2016–17 NCAA Division I women's basketball rankings

See also
2016–17 Oklahoma State Cowboys basketball team

References

Oklahoma State Cowgirls basketball seasons
Oklahoma State
2017 Women's National Invitation Tournament participants
2016 in sports in Oklahoma
2017 in sports in Oklahoma